The 2019 Supercopa de Chile (known as the Súper Copa Easy 2019 for sponsorship purposes) was the seventh edition of the Supercopa de Chile, championship organised by the Asociación Nacional de Fútbol Profesional (ANFP). The match was played by the 2018 Chilean Primera División champions Universidad Católica and the 2018 Copa Chile winners Palestino on 23 March 2019 at Estadio Sausalito in Viña del Mar.

Universidad Católica were the winners, beating Palestino by a 5–0 score.

Teams

The two teams that contested the Supercopa were Universidad Católica, who qualified as 2018 Primera División champions and Palestino, who qualified for the match as the 2018 Copa Chile winners, defeating Audax Italiano in the two-legged final by a 4–2 aggregate score.

Details

Champion

References

2019 in Chilean football
S